Andrew Bennett  may refer to:
Andrew Percy Bennett (1866–1943), British diplomat, envoy to Panama, 1920–1923, and Venezuela, 1923–1925
Andrew Carl Bennett (1889–1971), US Navy admiral
Andrew Bennett (politician) (born 1939), British Labour Party politician
Andy Bennett (born 1955), Australian rules footballer
Andrew Bennett (academic) (born 1972), Canadian academic and the first ambassador of the Canadian Office of Religious Freedom
Drew Bennett (born 1978), American football wide receiver
Andy Bennett (musician) (born 1985), English singer and musician
Andrew Bennett, fictional character in the comic series I…Vampire